Julio Jiménez Rueda (April 10, 1896 – June 25, 1960) was a Mexican lawyer, writer, playwright and diplomat.

Biography
Jiménez Rueda studied at the Escuela Nacional Preparatoria, and graduated in law at the Universidad Nacional de México (later UNAM) in 1919. Later on, he was appointed as the director of the Escuela Nacional de Arte Teatral of UNAM. He completed a doctoral degree of philosophy and literature in 1935. As a diplomat, he served in Montevideo in 1920, and afterwards in Buenos Aires until 1922. Back in Mexico he was the director of the General Archive of the Nation, and later president of the Centro Mexicano de Escritores. In 1923 he promoted the creation of the Municipal Theater, fostered the creation of the Unión de Autores Dramáticos (Dramatic Writers' Union), and participated in the Teatro Ulises movement. He became a corresponding member of the Academia Mexicana de la Lengua on August 7, 1935, and of the Academia Mexicana de la Historia in 1954. He directed the Faculty of Philosophy and Literature of the UNAM, where he taught Spanish literature for many years. He also was co-founder of the Instituto Internacional de Literatura Iberoamericana (IILI).

Works
 Cuentos y diálogos, 1918
 Sor Adoración del Divino Verbo, 1923
 Lo que ella no pudo prever, 1923
 Moisn. Historia de judaizantes e inquisidores, 1924
 La silueta de humo, 1928
 Resúmenes de literatura mexicana (essay), 1928
 Juan Ruiz de Alarcón (essay), 1934
 La desventura del Conde Kadski, 1935
 Vidas reales que parecen imaginarias
 Don Pedro Moya de Contreras, primer inquisidor de México (essay), 1944
 Herejías y supersticiones de la Nueva España (essay),1946
 Novelas coloniales, 1947
 El humanismo, el barroco y la contrarreforma en el México virreinal, 1951
 El doctor Francisco Castillo Nájera, 1954
 Historia de la cultura en México, el mundo prehispánico, 1957
 Literatura mexicana del siglo XIX

External links

References

20th-century Mexican male writers
Mexican diplomats
Mexican dramatists and playwrights
People from Mexico City
National Autonomous University of Mexico alumni
Academic staff of the National Autonomous University of Mexico
1896 births
1960 deaths
20th-century Mexican dramatists and playwrights